Gilpin is former railroad siding, located in the far northeast region of Storey County, Nevada.

The GNIS locates Gilpin on the south side of the Truckee River, which is where there was a non-agency siding between Thisbe and Fernley on the Southern Pacific Railroad.  The siding was abandoned in 1959.

In the 1930s, the site of Gilpin was on the north side of the river in Washoe County.  In 1905, Captain Matt Barach laid out a townsite at the Washoe County side.  At that time a road to Olinghouse was planned but never built.  Gilpin can be accessed via the Painted Rock exit on Interstate 80.

A nearby rest area on Interstate 80 is named Gilpin.

References 

Geography of Reno, Nevada
Unincorporated communities in Storey County, Nevada
Unincorporated communities in Nevada